Josie DiVincenzo is an American television and film actress. She has had roles in series such as CSI: Crime Scene Investigation and Beverly Hills, 90210, and has appeared in films including Daredevil (2003). She also appeared in episode 16 of series 2 of Friends as the Tattoo artist.

References

American film actresses
American television actresses
Living people
Year of birth missing (living people)
21st-century American women